Charles Landry (born June 3, 1991) is a Canadian former professional ice hockey defenceman. He last played professionally with the Brest Albatros of the Ligue Magnus, and currently plays for the Cornwall Prowlers of the Eastern Ontario Senior Hockey League (EOSHL).

Playing career
Landry played four seasons (2007 – 2011) of major junior hockey in the Quebec Major Junior Hockey League (QMJHL), registering 96 points and 159 penalty minutes in 234 games played.

On September 15, 2010, the Tampa Bay Lightning signed Landry as a free agent to a three-year entry level contract, but he did not play his first professional game until after the conclusion of his 2010–11 QMJHL season with the Lightning's American Hockey League affiliate, the Norfolk Admirals.

On July 15, 2014, the Nottingham Panthers of the UK's EIHL announced that Landry would be joining them for their upcoming campaign on a one-year deal. He then went on to join the Brest Albatros of France's Ligue Magnus for the 2015-16 season.

After leaving Brest, he spent two seasons with the Saint-Gabriel Loups of the Ligue Hockey Senior Richelieu before joining the Cornwall Prowlers of the EOSHL in 2019.

Career statistics

References

External links

1991 births
Living people
Canadian ice hockey defencemen
Drummondville Voltigeurs players
Sportspeople from Longueuil
Florida Everblades players
Montreal Junior Hockey Club players
Norfolk Admirals players
Syracuse Crunch players
Ice hockey people from Quebec
Nottingham Panthers players
Canadian expatriate ice hockey players in England